Deinandra fasciculata  (syn: Hemizonia fasciculata), known by the common names clustered tarweed and fascicled spikeweed, is a species of flowering plant in the family Asteraceae native to western North America.

Range
Deinandra fasciculata is native to Baja California and California (primarily from San Diego County to Monterey County, including several of the Channel Islands; Calflora reports a few collections from the San Francisco Bay area, but these are from urban areas and probably represent cultivated specimens). It is a common member of coastal grassland habitats in the California chaparral and woodlands ecoregion and other habitats.

Description
Deinandra fasciculata is a thin-stemmed branched annual herb growing erect up to 100 cm (40 inches) in height. The upper leaves are narrow, about 1 centimeter long nested against the stem (more like short needles than leaves). The lower leaves are much bigger, up to 15 centimeters (6 inches) long.

Each flower head has a center of six yellowish disc florets with black stamens surrounded by five yellow ray florets. The ray florets generally have three teeth, the central tooth being the smallest. Plants flower in May through October.

In this genus the disk flowers are actually big enough to be seen as tiny flowers to the naked eye.

The plant has a tar-like smell.

Ecology
Deinandra fasciculata is pollinated by bees, and the seeds are primarily gravity-dispersed (they fall from the seed heads when mature). Seeds may also be dispersed by the many bird and small mammal species which eat them.

This species may hybridize with other members of its genus, as well as with Hemizonia and Centromadia species.

References

External links

Jepson eFlora (TJM2) Treatment of Deinandra fasciculata
Archived: Jepson Manual (TJM93): Hemizonia fasciculata
Hemizonia fasciculata — Calphotos Photos gallery, University of California

fasciculata
Flora of California
Flora of Baja California
Natural history of the California chaparral and woodlands
Natural history of the California Coast Ranges
Natural history of the Channel Islands of California
Natural history of the Peninsular Ranges
Natural history of the Santa Monica Mountains
Natural history of the Transverse Ranges
Plants described in 1836
Flora without expected TNC conservation status